The Bishop of Adelaide may refer to:

 Anglican Bishop of Adelaide, precursor title of the Anglican Archbishop of Adelaide
 Roman Catholic Bishop of Adelaide, precursor title of the Roman Catholic Archbishop of Adelaide